John Riley Brodie (born August 14, 1935) is an American former professional football player who was a quarterback for the San Francisco 49ers of the National Football League (NFL) for 17 seasons. He had a second career as a Senior PGA Tour professional golfer, and was a television broadcaster for both sports.

During various years of his NFL career, Brodie led the league in passing yardage, passing touchdowns, fewest sacks, and lowest percentage of passes intercepted.

Biography

Early years and education
Born in Menlo Park, California, Brodie grew up in the Montclair district of Oakland and attended Montclair Grammar (later Elementary) School. He was a standout athlete at Oakland Technical High School and graduated in 1953.

Brodie played college football across the San Francisco Bay at Stanford University, where he was admitted to the Zeta Psi fraternity.  In his senior season of 1956, Brodie was a consensus All-American and also played on the Stanford golf team, which kept him out of spring football drills.

Brodie nearly chose golf for his sporting career, turning professional following completion of his time on the Stanford team and playing in several tournaments on the PGA Tour.

Brodie later said of his first golfing experience:
"You talk about pressure. I was always worried that I wasn't going to make the cut. Fact is there was only one time I was close enough to say I was in competition in the final round. I had to make up my mind. I couldn't be  pro in two sports and do justice to either one."

Professional football career

Brodie was the third overall selection of the 1957 NFL draft and saw limited action as a rookie with the 49ers in 1957.  He got more playing time in 1958 through 1960, sharing time with Y. A. Tittle; he became the starter in 1961 (Tittle was traded to the New York Giants), and continued in that role through 1973.

Brodie was among the leading passers in the league throughout the 1960s.  His best statistical year was 1965, when he led the league in passing yardage (3,112 yards) and passing touchdowns (30), leading to his first of two Pro Bowl appearances.

Following his outstanding 1965 season, in which he made about $35,000, Brodie was courted by the Houston Oilers of the rival AFL. Newspaper reports indicated that a contract with the Oilers paying between $650,000 and $1 million had been arranged. After the NFL Giants signed kicker Pete Gogolak from the AFL champion Bills, offers to Brodie and other NFL stars, like Mike Ditka and Roman Gabriel, expedited the merger agreement between the two leagues in June . An improved contract offer from the 49ers moved Brodie to stay put in San Francisco, however, and a multi-year deal paying Brodie $900,000 over several seasons was instead inked.

The 1970 season proved to be  particularly stellar for Brodie. During that year, he led the entire NFL with 24 touchdown passes, 223 completions, 2,941 yards, and a passer rating of 93.8. while taking a league low eight sacks during the entire season. Brodie also paced NFL quarterbacks with a league-leading 2.6% of his passes resulting in interception. Brodie's outstanding season was rewarded when he received the 1970 NFL Most Valuable Player Award, and the 49ers had the number one offense by points, and ultimately won their first playoff game in franchise history.

When Brodie retired from the NFL at the end of the 1973 season, he ranked third in career passing yards, behind only Johnny Unitas and Fran Tarkenton. He ranked eighth in touchdown passes upon his retirement, and  stayed in the top ten for most touchdown passes from 1970 to 1988. On each list, only he and one other player are not in the Pro Football Hall of Fame (Babe Parilli and John Hadl, respectively).

In 2004, Brodie was named to the Professional Football Researchers Association Hall of Very Good in the association's second HOVG class.

Career after football

After he retired from football, Brodie served as an NFL football and golf analyst for NBC Sports. He spent two seasons (1977 and 1978) as the network's No. 1 NFL analyst, alongside play-by-play man Curt Gowdy, and called Super Bowl XIII in January 1979. Among the other notable NFL games he worked was the Epic in Miami, the January 1982 AFC playoff game between the San Diego Chargers and Miami Dolphins, with play-by-play man Don Criqui.

He competed as a professional golfer on the Senior PGA Tour (now the Champions Tour) from 1985 to 1998. Brodie had one win and twelve top-ten finishes, earning a total of $735,000. He had the longest gap between appearances in the U.S. Open — missing the cut in both 1959 and 1981.

Brodie suffered a major stroke in 2000, rendering speech difficult for him.

In 2006, Brodie's number 12 jersey was brought out of retirement and worn by Trent Dilfer, backup quarterback for the 49ers.  Dilfer, a close personal friend of Brodie, hoped to bring attention to Brodie's bid for enshrinement in the Pro Football Hall of Fame. He was inducted into the College Football Hall of Fame in 1986.

In 2010, Brodie was inducted into the African-American Ethnic Sports Hall of Fame, becoming the first European-American so honored.

Personal life
John married his wife Sue in 1957. They have four daughters and a son, and 12 grandchildren. One of his daughters, Erin, found fame on television in 2003 during the first season of the reality series For Love or Money, while another daughter, Diane, was married until 2011 to former NFL quarterback Chris Chandler. His son-in-law is the renowned dermatologist Dr. Will Kirby.

During the 1969 season, Brodie experienced tendinitis in his throwing arm, which caused him to miss two and a half games. He received cortisone shots in an effort to remedy the problem, without apparent success. In desperation for relief, Brodie was introduced to a representative of the Church of Scientology, who — Brodie insisted at the time — used Dianetics-based techniques to eliminate the tendinitis by the following week. Thus began a connection between Brodie and the church.

Brodie was for years thereafter one of the leading celebrity endorsers of the Church of Scientology. This public role was ultimately ended when several of Brodie's friends were expelled or harassed in a power struggle with the Church's hierarchy. While professing continued admiration for the teachings of church founder L. Ron Hubbard, "there were many in the church I felt were treated unfairly," Brodie told the Los Angeles Times in 2006.

Professional wins (1)

Senior PGA Tour wins (1)

Senior PGA Tour playoff record (1–0)

Results in major championships

CUT = missed the halfway cut
Note: Brodie only played in the U.S. Open.

See also
Bay Area Sports Hall of Fame
List of NCAA major college football yearly passing leaders
List of NCAA major college football yearly total offense leaders

Footnotes

External links

Sports Reference – collegiate statistics – John Brodie

1935 births
Living people
All-American college football players
Players of American football from California
American football quarterbacks
San Francisco 49ers players
Western Conference Pro Bowl players
National Conference Pro Bowl players
Stanford Cardinal football players
College Football Hall of Fame inductees
National Football League players with retired numbers
National Football League announcers
Canadian Football League announcers
College football announcers
American former Scientologists
American male golfers
Stanford Cardinal men's golfers
PGA Tour Champions golfers
Golf writers and broadcasters
Golfers from California
Sportspeople from the San Francisco Bay Area
American male non-fiction writers
National Football League Most Valuable Player Award winners